Andrew Hurley is primarily known as an English translator of Spanish literature, having translated a variety of authors, most notably the Argentine writer Jorge Luis Borges. He has published over 30 book-length translations.

Hurley obtained his doctorate in 1973 from Rice University, with a thesis on narrative strategies and reader response in the theory of the novel. He taught in the English Department of the Universidad de Puerto Rico and was named Professor Emeritus in 2009.

Authors translated

Bartolomé de las Casas (1474–1566) Spain
Rubén Darío (1867–1916) Nicaragua
Jorge Luis Borges (1899–1986) Argentina
Ernesto Sabato (1911–2011) Argentina
Margo Glantz (1930–) Mexico
Heberto Padilla (1932–2000) Cuba
Armando Valladares (1937–) Cuba
Antonio Martorell (1939–) Puerto Rico
Gustavo Sáinz (1940–) Mexico
Reinaldo Arenas (1943–1990) Cuba
Luce López-Baralt (1944–) Puerto Rico
Ana Lydia Vega (1946–) Puerto Rico
Edgardo Rodríguez Juliá (1946–) Puerto Rico
Arturo Pérez-Reverte (1951–) Spain
Julia Navarro (1953–) Spain
Zoé Valdés (1959–) Cuba
Cristina Rivera Garza (1964–) Mexico

Notes

External links
Faculty Profile of Andrew Hurley

Living people
Puerto Rican academics
Spanish–English translators
University of Puerto Rico faculty
Rice University alumni
Translators of Jorge Luis Borges
20th-century translators
Year of birth missing (living people)
American translators